Alwin Schockemöhle (born 29 May 1937) is a former German show-jumper. He was a successful international show jumping equestrian in the 1960s and 1970s at individual and team events in Olympic Games and European Championships.  He was one of four children, a girl and three boys.  His younger brother Paul was also a successful show-jumper.  Werner Schockemöhle, his youngest brother was a well-known horse breeder in Oldenburg.

Biography

Schockemöhle was involved in horses from an early age, and sold his grey mare Anaconda to the American equestrian Mary Mairs for DM100,000.  His success in horse-dealing allowed him to fund the debt-ridden family estate when he took it over, aged 20.

Schockemöhle won his first Olympic gold medal in 1960 on the German show jumping team, followed in 1968 by a bronze medal. At the 1976 Summer Olympics, he won both gold in the individual and a silver medal with the German team which he was part of with his brother.  He has won both the European and German championships several times.

By his first wife Gaby, who later married Hendrik Snoek, he had a daughter, Alexandra, and two sons, Christoph who lives in Singapore, and Frank who is a manager in the German Bundesliga, and two daughters, Vanessa and Christina by his second wife Rita Schockemöhle.  Rita also had three children by her previous husband Gerhard Wiltfang – Alwin has been quoted as saying "She has four children, I have five, altogether there are seven".

Schockemöhle was inducted into Germany's Sports Hall of Fame in July 2016.

Major achievements

Olympic Games
1960 in Rome: Gold medal team, individual 26th on Ferdl
1968 in Mexico City: Bronze medal team, individual 7th on Donald Rex
1976 in Montreal: Silver medal team, Gold medal individual on Warwick Rex
European Championships
1963 in Rome Bronze medal team, Silver medal individual on Ferdl and Freiherr
1965 in Aachen: Bronze medal individual  on Freiherr
1967 in Rotterdam: Bronze medal individual  on Donald Rex and Pesgö
1969 in Hickstead: Silver medal individual on Donald Rex and Wimpel
1973 in Hickstead: Silver medal individual on Rex the Robber and Weiler
1975 in Munich: Gold medal team, Gold medal individual on Warwick Rex
Other
Four times German champion (1961, 1963, 1967, 1975)
Thrice champion of the Grand Prix of Aachen (1962 on Freiherr, 1968 on Donald Rex and 1969 on Wimpel)
Thrice champion of the German Jumping Derby in Hamburg (1957, 1969, 1971)

References

Sources
 derStandard.de June 2002
 Rheinlands Reiter – Pferde July 2004
 Eckhard F. Schröter: Das Glück dieser Erde. Leben and Karriere deutscher Springreiter.. Fischer-Taschenbuch-Verlag, Frankfurt a. M. 1980,

External links

 
 Alwin Schockemöhle official website

1937 births
Living people
People from Meppen
German male equestrians
German show jumping riders
Olympic equestrians of the United Team of Germany
Olympic equestrians of West Germany
People from the Province of Hanover
Equestrians at the 1960 Summer Olympics
Equestrians at the 1968 Summer Olympics
Equestrians at the 1976 Summer Olympics
Olympic gold medalists for the United Team of Germany
Olympic gold medalists for West Germany
Olympic silver medalists for West Germany
Olympic bronze medalists for West Germany
Olympic medalists in equestrian
Medalists at the 1976 Summer Olympics
Medalists at the 1968 Summer Olympics
Medalists at the 1960 Summer Olympics
Sportspeople from Lower Saxony